Rubrinectria is a genus of ascomycete fungi in the family Nectriaceae. It is a monotypic genus containing the sole species Rubrinectria olivacea.

External links
 

Nectriaceae genera
Monotypic Sordariomycetes genera